Lone Tree Township is a township in Chippewa County, Minnesota, United States.  The population was 256 at the 2000 census.

History
Lone Tree Township was organized in 1878, and named from an individual cottonwood tree which stood as a landmark for the first settlers.

Geography
According to the United States Census Bureau, the township has a total area of 36.2 square miles (93.8 km2), all  land.

Demographics
As of the census of 2000, there were 256 people, 86 households, and 73 families residing in the township.  The population density was 7.1 people per square mile (2.7/km2).  There were 94 housing units at an average density of 2.6/sq mi (1.0/km2).  The racial makeup of the township was 97.66% White, 0.39% African American, 1.95% from other races. Hispanic or Latino of any race were 3.91% of the population.

There were 86 households, out of which 45.3% had children under the age of 18 living with them, 79.1% were married couples living together, 1.2% had a female householder with no husband present, and 15.1% were non-families. 12.8% of all households were made up of individuals, and 4.7% had someone living alone who was 65 years of age or older.  The average household size was 2.98 and the average family size was 3.26.

In the township the population was spread out, with 32.0% under the age of 18, 7.8% from 18 to 24, 27.0% from 25 to 44, 25.0% from 45 to 64, and 8.2% who were 65 years of age or older.  The median age was 39 years. For every 100 females, there were 100.0 males.  For every 100 females age 18 and over, there were 112.2 males.

The median income for a household in the township was $46,250, and the median income for a family was $50,000. Males had a median income of $30,313 versus $27,083 for females. The per capita income for the township was $20,397.  About 12.5% of families and 12.4% of the population were below the poverty line, including 12.5% of those under the age of eighteen and 7.1% of those 65 or over.

References

Townships in Chippewa County, Minnesota
Townships in Minnesota